Turbid Creek may refer to:
 Turbid Creek (Alaska)
 Turbid Creek (British Columbia)